Newington is a town in Rockingham County, New Hampshire, United States. The population was 811 at the 2020 census. It is bounded to the west by Great Bay, northwest by Little Bay and northeast by the Piscataqua River. It is home to Portsmouth International Airport at Pease (formerly Pease Air Force Base) and to the New Hampshire Air National Guard. The  Old Town Center Historic District is listed on the National Register of Historic Places.

History 

Originally a part of Dover, boundary disputes among early river settlers caused this area to be called "Bloody Point". By 1640, Trickey's Ferry operated between Bloody Point and Hilton's Point in Dover. In 1712, the meetinghouse was erected and the parish set off, named "Newington" for an English village, whose residents sent the bell for the meetinghouse. Behind the meetinghouse is a row of horse sheds, once commonplace but now rare. About 1725 the parsonage was built near the Town Forest, considered one of the oldest in the United States. The town was incorporated in 1764 by colonial governor Benning Wentworth. In 1794, a bridge was completed across Little Bay from Fox Point in Newington to the south bank of the Bellamy River in Dover, by way of Goat Island—a major engineering feat in its day.

In 1952, the House Armed Services Committee authorized acquiring by eminent domain large tracts to create Pease Air Force Base, which opened on June 30, 1956. Approximately 60% of the installation lay in Newington, including land in the town's center, and 40% was in neighboring Portsmouth. It would be, however, the first base recommended to be closed by the 1988 Commission on Base Realignment and Closure. Military personnel in 1990 began leaving the base, which officially closed on March 31, 1991. Although the Air National Guard retained some property, the old base has been intensely redeveloped, primarily in the Portsmouth section, as the Pease International Tradeport, a business park.

In the 1970s and 1980s, commercial development from Portsmouth spread into Newington. The Newington Mall opened in the 1970s (replaced by the Crossings at Fox Run in the 2000s), followed by the Fox Run Mall.

Geography

The town is crossed by U.S. Route 4 and New Hampshire Route 16.

Adjacent municipalities
 Dover, New Hampshire (north)
 Eliot, Maine (northeast)
 Portsmouth, New Hampshire (southeast)
 Greenland, New Hampshire (south)
 Newmarket (southwest)
 Durham, New Hampshire (west)

Demographics

As of the census of 2000, there were 775 people, 294 households, and 209 families residing in the town.  The population density was 92.7 people per square mile (35.8/km).  There were 305 housing units at an average density of 36.5 per square mile (14.1/km).  The racial makeup of the town was 96.00% White, 1.81% African American, 0.26% Native American, 1.03% Asian, and 0.90% from two or more races. Hispanic or Latino of any race were 1.81% of the population.

There were 294 households, out of which 28.2% had children under the age of 18 living with them, 59.5% were married couples living together, 6.8% had a female householder with no husband present, and 28.9% were non-families. 21.8% of all households were made up of individuals, and 8.2% had someone living alone who was 65 years of age or older.  The average household size was 2.55 and the average family size was 3.01.

In the town, the population was spread out, with 21.9% under the age of 18, 4.6% from 18 to 24, 28.4% from 25 to 44, 32.1% from 45 to 64, and 12.9% who were 65 years of age or older.  The median age was 43 years. For every 100 females, there were 98.7 males.  For every 100 females age 18 and over, there were 93.9 males.

The median income for a household in the town was $59,464, and the median income for a family was $76,202. Males had a median income of $48,750 versus $30,250 for females. The per capita income for the town was $30,172.  About 5.0% of families and 4.6% of the population were below the poverty line, including 4.8% of those under age 18 and 5.3% of those age 65 or over.

Economy
According to the 2016 Auditor's Report, the top businesses in Newington, ranked by assessed value, are:

 EP Newington Energy (a 575 megawatt electric power plant) now owned by Carlyle Power Partners
Eversource Energy (power plant)
Fox Run Joint Venture (mall)
SBAF Running Fox (mall)
Sprague & Sons (materials handling services)

Another local firm, Little Bay Lobster Co., exported about 50,000 pounds of lobster a week to China in early 2018. SubCom produces transoceanic fiber optic cable, which, as it is being produced, is loaded directly onto a cable laying ship docked nearby on the Piscataqua River.

Site of interest
 Great Bay National Wildlife Refuge

Notable people 

 John Pickering (1737–1805), federal judge, Chief Justice of the New Hampshire Superior Court
 Louis de Rochemont (1899–1978), filmmaker

References

External links
 
 Langdon Public Library
 New Hampshire Economic and Labor Market Information Bureau Profile

 
Towns in Rockingham County, New Hampshire
Populated places established in 1764
Towns in New Hampshire
1764 establishments in New Hampshire